Kandhan Karunai is a 1967 Indian Tamil-language Hindu mythological film, written and directed by A. P. Nagarajan. It features an ensemble cast including Sivaji Ganesan, Gemini Ganesan, K. B. Sundarambal, Savitri, Jayalalithaa, K. R. Vijaya and Sivakumar. This was the debut film for Sridevi, who had starred as Lord Murugan at the age of 3.

Plot 
The film revolves around Murugan, his birth, marriage and his acceptance of the post of the head of the army of heaven. In Hinduism, there are six abodes of lord Muruga, known as the "Arupadaiveedu". The story behind each of the abodes are portrayed chronologically in the film. It starts with Swamimalai, where Lord Muruga teaches the meaning of the word 'OM' to his father, Shiva. He goes to Palani Hills after a fight over a sacred fruit, that is his second abode. Then he wins over the demon king Surapadman in Thiruchendur and that is his third abode. The King of heaven, Indra offers his daughter's hand in appreciation of Lord Muruga's victory and he marries her in Thirupparamkunram, his fourth abode. He later marries Valli in his fifth abode of Thiruthani, later after a short dispute between both his wives they amicably settle in Pazhamudircholai, his sixth abode. All the events are summarised by Nakkeerar, a great Tamil poet portrayed by Sirkazhi Govindarajan at the end of the film.

Cast

Production 
Vijayakumar was  supposed to play Lord Murugan in the film but he was replaced by Sivakumar. Vijayakumar instead appeared as one of the lords who was in the jail. This was the debut film for actress Sridevi.

Soundtrack 
The music was composed by K. V. Mahadevan, for which he received the National Film Award for Best Music Direction. The song "Thiruparankundrathil Nee" was composed by Kunnakudi Vaidyanathan. The song "Arupadai Veedu" is a ragamalika; it starts off with Kambodhi followed by Hindolam, Chakravakam, Kaanada, Hamsanandhi, Natakurinji and Kapi. "Solla Solla inikkudhadaa" song is set to Kundhalavarali raaga."Thiruparankundrathil Nee" song set in Suddha Dhanyasi ragam and "Arumugamana Porul" song set in Mohanam ragam."Vellimalai Mannava" song set in Charukesi ragam.

Reception 
Kalki appreciated Nagarajan for taking an old story and reinventing it.

References

External links 
 

1960s Tamil-language films
1967 films
Films about Hinduism
Films directed by A. P. Nagarajan
Films scored by K. V. Mahadevan
Films with screenplays by A. P. Nagarajan
Hindu mythological films